The Unwelcome Mrs. Hatch is a 1914 American drama film directed by Allan Dwan, written by Allan Dwan and Mrs. Burton Harrison, and starring Henrietta Crosman, Walter Craven, Lorraine Huling, Minna Gale and Harold Lockwood. It was released on September 10, 1914, by Paramount Pictures.

Plot

Cast 
Henrietta Crosman as Mrs. Hatch
Walter Craven as Richard Lorimer
Lorraine Huling as Gladys Lorimer
Minna Gale as Second Mrs. Lorimer
Harold Lockwood as Jack Adrian
Paul Trevor as Harry Brown
Gertrude Norman as Old Agnes

References

External links 
 

1914 films
1910s English-language films
Silent American drama films
1914 drama films
Paramount Pictures films
Films directed by Allan Dwan
American black-and-white films
American silent feature films
1910s American films